Caloptilia fidella is a moth of the family Gracillariidae. It is found from Germany to Italy and North Macedonia and from France to Russia and Ukraine.

The larvae feed on Celtis australis and Humulus lupulus. They mine the leaves of their host plant. The mine has the form of a small, triangular, full depth blotch mine in a vein axle. Part of the frass is ejected and the remainder lies scattered in the mine. Older larvae live freely under a rolled leaf margin.

References

fidella
Moths of Europe
Moths described in 1853